This is a list of members of the  New Democratic Party Shadow Cabinet of the 43rd Canadian Parliament.  Positions in the shadow cabinet were announced on November 28, 2019, and included all 24 members of the New Democratic Party caucus in the Canadian House of Commons.

Current Shadow Cabinet Members

November 28, 2019 - September 20, 2021

References 

New Democratic Party (Canada)
43rd Canadian Parliament
Canadian shadow cabinets